Your Computer was an Australian computer magazine published by the White House Publishing Group (under licence from Motorword Pty Ltd.) and printed by The Lithgo Centre, Waterloo. Starting with the very first issue in May/June 1981 (102 pages) (with a limited print run of 30,000) at the recommended price of $2.00. Around 1985 the magazine was later published by Federal Publishing Company (Hannanprint Group) and printed by Macquarie Print. The monthly magazine's final issue was May/June 1997. The first editor of the magazine was Les Bell.

The articles in Your Computer catered for beginners to computing, through to highly technical programming techniques, industry updates, resources, user group and microcomputer-specific columns, and published many special features of Australian technology companies. Articles were written by both full-time magazine staff and freelance contributors, including Les Bell, Matt Whalen, Bill Bolton, Stewart White and Lloyd Borrett. Cartoonist Brendan J Ackhurst was also a frequent contributor of illustrations to the magazine. The magazine was launched in the pre-PC era, and so for many years, the magazine was focused on the then home computers such as the Commodore 64, Apple II, Microbee and many others; however unlike most publications of this type, it never completely specialized on any one market, and so catered for hobbyists, serious hobbyists, and professionals, and remained platform agnostic.

References

Notes

  –  Apple's Lisa 2, the Australian Personal Computer of the Year. APPLE Computer's innovative Lisa personal computer was adjudged Australian Personal Computer of the Year by Your Computer magazine last month.
  – Hewlett-Packard's Model 110 portable computer has been judged the personal computer of the year in a competition run by Your Computer magazine. Microsoft's $95 Flight Simulator II program has won the software product of the year award.
  – IBM's PC AT has been awarded Your Computer magazine's 1986 award for personal computer of the year
  –  Your Computer magazine announced the winner of its Personal Computer of the Year Award. It was won by the ma chine that many people" think IBM should have designed but didn't, the remarkable 32 bit Compaq Deskpro 386. ... Aldus Corporation's Pagemaker was named software product of the year
  – The Macintosh II has won the 1988 Australian Hardware of the Year Award. The annual award hosted by Your Computer magazine, is compiled by a group of industry specialists and is probably the most prestigious in the Australian computer industry.

1981 establishments in Australia
1997 disestablishments in Australia
Computer magazines published in Australia
Defunct computer magazines
Defunct magazines published in Australia
Home computer magazines
Magazines established in 1981
Magazines disestablished in 1997
Mass media in New South Wales
Monthly magazines published in Australia